This list shows cover versions of songs originally by the Irish rock band U2 that have been recorded and released.

"40"
"40" is the tenth and final track from U2's 1983 album, War. It is the final single from the album, released solely in Germany in 1983. The song was recorded right at the end of the recording sessions for War. Bassist Adam Clayton had already left the studio, and the three remaining band members decided they did not have a good song to end the album. Bono noted that "We spent ten minutes writing this song, ten minutes recording it, ten minutes mixing it, ten minutes playing it back, and that's got nothing to do with why it's called '40'."

{|class="wikitable"
|-
! Year
! Covered by
! Album
|-
| 1997
| Charlie Hall
| Joels Window|-
| 2000
| The Section
| Strung out on U2|-
| 2001
| dc Talk
| Solo|-
| 2001
| Apt.core
| Rhythms Of Remembrance|-
| 2002
| Michael W. Smith
| Worship DVD|-
| 2003
| Paul Meany
| Elevator Music (Live Worship From Victory Fellowship)|-
| 2003
| Trent
| Hold On|-

| 2004
| Starfield
| In the Name of Love: Artists United for Africa
|-
| 2005
| The Frames
| Even Better Than the Real Thing Vol. 3|}

 Acrobat 
"Acrobat" is the eleventh track from U2's 1991 album Achtung Baby.

All I Want Is You
"All I Want Is You" is the 17th song on U2's 1988 album, Rattle and Hum and was released in 1989 as the album's fourth and final single. It is the closing song from the movie Rattle and Hum.

An Cat Dubh
"An Cat Dubh" is the third track from U2's debut album, Boy. It is frequently paired with the following song from the same album, "Into the Heart".

Angel of Harlem
"Angel of Harlem" is the second single from U2's 1988 album, Rattle and Hum. It peaked at #9 on the UK singles chart. It is an homage to Billie Holiday.

Bad
"Bad" is the seventh track from U2's 1984 album, The Unforgettable Fire. Often considered a fan favorite, it is U2's tenth most frequently performed song in concert. The song is about a heroin addiction.

Beautiful Day
"Beautiful Day" is the lead single from U2's 2000 album, All That You Can't Leave Behind. It was a huge commercial success, helping to launch the album to multi-platinum status, and is one of U2's biggest hits to date.

Breathe
"Breathe" is the tenth track from U2's 2009 album No Line on the Horizon. Longtime U2 collaborator and producer Brian Eno cited Breathe as "the best thing (U2) have ever recorded" during an interview with Q magazine.

Bullet the Blue Sky
"Bullet the Blue Sky" is the fourth track from U2's 1987 album, The Joshua Tree. The song was originally written about the United States' military intervention during the 1980s in the El Salvador Civil War.

City of Blinding Lights
"City of Blinding Lights" is the fifth track and third single from the 2005 album How to Dismantle an Atomic Bomb. The song tells the story of U2's first arrival in New York City in 1980, with Bono remarking it was an "amazing, magical time in our life, when we didn't know how powerful it was not to know."

Desire
"Desire" is the lead single from U2's 1988 album, Rattle and Hum. It was their first #1 single in the UK and their first #1 on the newly instated Modern Rock Tracks chart.

Discothèque
"Discothèque" is the lead single and opening track from the 1997 album, Pop. It is the only song from the album to have been played on every tour since its debut.

Drowning Man
"Drowning Man" is the fifth track on U2's 1983 album, War. Its sound is a departure from the other tracks in War.

The Electric Co.
"The Electric Co." is the tenth track from U2's debut album, Boy. When performed live it is frequently preceded by the unrecorded song, "The Cry".

Elevation
"Elevation" is the third track and third single release from U2's 2000 album, All That You Can't Leave Behind. Featuring a thunderous beat, a variety of sound effects on the central guitar riff, and an easy rhyming lyric for the audience to shout along with, it was highly effective in that concert-starting role and became a hit in the United States and the United Kingdom.

Even Better Than the Real Thing
"Even Better Than the Real Thing" is the second song from U2's 1991 album, Achtung Baby and was released in 1992 as the fourth single from the album.

Exit
Exit is the 10th track of U2's Joshua Tree, released in 1987.

The Fly
"The Fly" is the seventh song on U2's 1991 album, Achtung Baby and was released as the album's first single. It has been described as "the sound of four men chopping down the Joshua Tree." The song's subject is that of a phone call from someone in Hell who enjoys being there and telling the person on the other line what he has learned. "The Fly" was an introduction to the sonic and electronic experimentation that would dominate U2's 1990s work.

Get on Your Boots
"Get on Your Boots" is the lead single and sixth track from No Line on the Horizon.

Gloria
"Gloria" was the second single and opening track from U2's 1981 album, October.

God Part II
"God Part II" is the fourteenth track from U2's 1988 album, Rattle and Hum. The song is a departure from the sound of the album's other studio recordings, and is an introduction to the darker sound the band would adopt for the release of their next album, Achtung Baby.

Grace
"Grace" is the final track from U2's 2000 album, All That You Can't Leave Behind.

Heartland
"Heartland" is the thirteenth track from U2's 1988 album, Rattle and Hum. Unlike the other studio tracks from the album, "Heartland" was left over from The Joshua Tree sessions.

Hold Me, Thrill Me, Kiss Me, Kill Me
"Hold Me, Thrill Me, Kiss Me, Kill Me" is a single by U2 from the Batman Forever soundtrack album, released in 1995. It was also included on the compilation album, The Best of 1990-2000. As well as all the covers, "Weird Al" Yankovic parodied the song as "Cavity Search" for his 1996 album Bad Hair Day.

I Still Haven't Found What I'm Looking For
"I Still Haven't Found What I'm Looking For" is the second track from U2's 1987 album The Joshua Tree, and was released as the album's second single. The song grew from another song called "Under the Weather Girls", from which Larry Mullen Jr.'s drum track was used as a foundation. "I Still Haven't Found What I'm Looking For" is the most frequently covered U2 song.

I Will Follow
"I Will Follow" is the opening track from U2's debut album, Boy. It was written by Bono about the death of his mother, who died of a brain hemorrhage at the funeral of her father.

I'll Go Crazy If I Don't Go Crazy Tonight
"I'll Go Crazy If I Don't Go Crazy Tonight" is the third single and fifth track from the 2009 album No Line on the Horizon. The track underwent several name changes during the album sessions, known first as "Diorama" and then "Crazy Tonight" before the final selection. Several of the song's lyrics were influenced by Barack Obama's presidential campaign. The song was used in television commercials for a new Blackberry application, called the "U2 Mobile App", which was developed as part of Research in Motion's sponsorship of the U2 360° Tour.

In a Little While
"In a Little While" is the sixth track from U2's 2000 album All That You Can't Leave Behind. While originally about a hangover, Bono later stated that the song's connection to Joey Ramone—being the last song he heard before his death in 2001—has given it a deeper religious meaning, and he now refers to it as a Gospel song". "In a Little While" was played often throughout the Elevation Tour, and was frequently snippeted inside "I Still Haven't Found What I'm Looking For" during the Vertigo Tour.

In God's Country
"In God's Country" is the seventh track and fourth single from U2's 1987 album, The Joshua Tree. A live version of the song appears in the U2 rockumentary, Rattle and Hum.

Like a Song...
"Like a Song..." is the fourth track from U2's 1983 album, War. It was only played live once, on 26 February 1983 in Dundee, Scotland.

Love Is Blindness
"Love Is Blindness" is the twelfth and final song from U2's 1991 album, Achtung Baby. Much of the album relates to love gone wrong, in one form or another; the lyrics to "Love Is Blindness" reflect this theme, juxtaposing love and violent imagery.

Love Rescue Me
"Love Rescue Me" is the eleventh track from U2's 1988 album, Rattle and Hum. It is a collaboration between the band and Bob Dylan, who also provides vocals to the recording.

Magnificent
"Magnificent" is the second track and single from No Line on the Horizon. The track was originally titled "French Disco", but was renamed during the recording process.

Miss Sarajevo
"Miss Sarajevo" is the only single from the 1995 album Original Soundtracks 1 by U2, under the pseudonym Passengers. Luciano Pavarotti makes a guest vocal appearance, singing the opera solo. It also appears on the compilation album, The Best of 1990–2000.

MLK
"MLK" is the tenth and final track of U2's 1984 album, The Unforgettable Fire. A lullaby to honor Martin Luther King Jr., it is a short, pensive piece with simple lyrics.

Moment of Surrender
"Moment of Surrender" is the third track from No Line on the Horizon. The song tells the story of a heroin addict's spiritual awakening at an automated teller machine.

Mothers of the Disappeared
"Mothers of the Disappeared" is the eleventh and final track from U2's 1987 album, The Joshua Tree.

Mysterious Ways
"Mysterious Ways" is the eighth track on U2's 1991 album, Achtung Baby, and was released as the album's second single.

New Year's Day
"New Year's Day" is the third song and lead single from U2's 1983 album, War. The song is driven by Adam Clayton's distinctive bassline and The Edge's keyboard. It was the band's first hit single, breaking the top ten in the UK and charting on the Billboard Hot 100 for the first time in their career. In 2004, Rolling Stone magazine placed the single at number 427 on their list of the 500 Greatest Songs of All Time.

No Line on the Horizon
"No Line on the Horizon" is the opening and title track from the 2009 album No Line on the Horizon.

North and South of the River
"North and South of the River" is a B-side to the 1997 single "Staring at the Sun".

Numb
"Numb" is the third track from U2's 1993 album, Zooropa, and was released as the album's first single.

October
"October" is the seventh and title track from U2's 1981 album, October. It is a departure from U2's classic sound, as it is a quiet, almost instrumental piece. It was included as a hidden track on The Best of 1980–1990.

One
"One" is the third song from U2's 1991 album, Achtung Baby, and was released as a single in 1992. Tensions during the recording of the album almost prompted U2 to break-up until the band rallied around the writing of "One". It is widely considered to be one of the band's greatest songs and is consistently featured in lists of the greatest songs of all time, including Rolling Stones list of the 500 Greatest Songs of All Time, where it placed #36, and #1 on Q Magazine's list of the 1001 Greatest Songs of All-Time.

One Tree Hill
"One Tree Hill" is the ninth track and final single from U2's 1987 album, The Joshua Tree. The single was released as a single exclusively in New Zealand in 1988, where it reached number one. The title of the song refers to One Tree Hill, a volcanic peak in Auckland, New Zealand.

Pride (In the Name of Love)
"Pride (In the Name of Love)" is the second song on U2's 1984 album, The Unforgettable Fire and was released as the album's first single. Written about Martin Luther King Jr., it is one of the band's most recognized songs.

Promenade
"Promenade" is the fifth track on U2's 1984 album, The Unforgettable Fire.

Red Hill Mining Town
"Red Hill Mining Town" is the sixth track from U2's 1987 album, The Joshua Tree.

Running to Stand Still
"Running to Stand Still" is the fifth track from U2's 1987 album, The Joshua Tree. It is a soft, slow, keyboard-based song about a heroin-addicted woman from the Ballymun Seven Towers area of Dublin.

Seconds
"Seconds" is the second track on U2's 1983 album, War. The track contains a clip from the 1982 documentary Soldier Girls, and is the first song by the band not sung solely by Bono; The Edge sings the first two stanzas.

Silver and Gold
"Silver and Gold" was originally written by Bono in support of the Artists United Against Apartheid project. It was recorded in 1985 by Bono, as well as Keith Richards and Ron Wood of The Rolling Stones. U2 later re-recorded and released the track as a B-side for their 1987 single, "Where the Streets Have No Name".

So Cruel
"So Cruel" is the sixth track from U2's 1991 album, Achtung Baby.

Sometimes You Can't Make It on Your Own
"Sometimes You Can't Make It on Your Own" is the second single from U2's 2004 album, How to Dismantle an Atomic Bomb. It was released in the United Kingdom in February 2005, and debuted at #1 on the UK Singles Chart. The song won Best Rock Performance by a Duo or Group with Vocal and Song of the Year at the 2006 Grammy Awards.

Stay (Faraway, So Close!)
"Stay (Faraway, So Close!)" is the fifth track from U2's 1993 album, Zooropa, and was released as the album's third single on November 22, 1993. It was released on the soundtrack for the Wim Wenders film, Faraway, So Close!. While speaking with Rolling Stone, Bono noted that "Stay (Faraway, So Close!)" is one of his personal favourite, and one of their most underrated, U2 songs.

Stuck in a Moment You Can't Get Out Of
"Stuck in a Moment You Can't Get Out Of" is a single release from U2's 2000 album, All That You Can't Leave Behind. It won the Grammy Award for Best Pop Performance by a Duo or Group with Vocal in 2002.

Sunday Bloody Sunday
"Sunday Bloody Sunday" is the opening track and third single from U2's 1983 album, War. The song is noted for its militaristic drumbeat, simple but harsh guitar, and melodic harmonies. One of U2's most overtly political songs, its lyrics describe the horror felt by an observer of The Troubles in Northern Ireland.

Sweetest Thing
"Sweetest Thing", sometimes titled "The Sweetest Thing", is a B-side to the "Where the Streets Have No Name" single. It was re-recorded and released as a single for the 1998 compilation album The Best of 1980-1990. The song was written by Bono as an apology to his wife for forgetting her birthday during the creation of The Joshua Tree.

The Three Sunrises
"The Three Sunrises" is a track from the 1985 EP Wide Awake in America.

Tomorrow
"Tomorrow" is the sixth track on 1981's October album.

Tryin' to Throw Your Arms Around the World
"Tryin' to Throw Your Arms Around the World" is the ninth track on the 1991 album, Achtung Baby. The song is a lighthearted account of a drunken journey home.

Two Hearts Beat as One
"Two Hearts Beat as One" is the seventh track on U2's 1983 album, War. It was released as the album's second single but only in the US, UK and Australia.

Ultraviolet (Light My Way)
"Ultraviolet (Light My Way)" is the tenth track from U2's 1991 album Achtung Baby.

The Unforgettable Fire
"The Unforgettable Fire" is the fourth track from the 1984 album of the same name, and was released in 1985 as the album's second and last single. The title is a reference to the atomic bombing of Hiroshima, Japan in World War II.

Unknown Caller
"Unknown Caller" is the fourth track from the 2009 album No Line on the Horizon. According to The Edge, "the idea is that the narrator is in an altered state, and his phone starts talking to him".

Until the End of the World
"Until the End of the World" is the fourth track from U2's 1991 album, Achtung Baby. The song is reputed to describe a conversation between Jesus Christ and Judas Iscariot.

Vertigo
"Vertigo" is the lead single and opening track for the 2004 album How to Dismantle an Atomic Bomb. The track was an international hit, winning three Grammy awards at the 2005 event and being featured in an iPod commercial.

The Wanderer
"The Wanderer" is the tenth and final track on the 1993 album Zooropa. The song features Johnny Cash on lead vocals and tells the story of a man searching for God in the ruins of a post-apocalyptic world. The song has only been performed live once, as a posthumous tribute to Johnny Cash, with Bono singing lead vocals.

Wake Up Dead Man
"Wake Up Dead Man" is the closing track from the 1997 album Pop. The title was first revealed in 1993, as part of it was superimposed on the cover of the album Zooropa.

Walk On
"Walk On" is the fourth single and track from the album All That You Can't Leave Behind. Written about and dedicated to Aung San Suu Kyi, the track is banned in Burma, and anyone who has possession of either the single of the song or the album could face a prison sentence lasting between three and twenty years. The title for All That You Can't Leave Behind stems from lyrics in the song.

When Love Comes to Town
"When Love Comes to Town" was a collaboration between U2 and B.B. King, released as a single for the album Rattle and Hum.

Where the Streets Have No Name
"Where the Streets Have No Name" is the third single from the 1987 album The Joshua Tree. The track's signature is a repeating guitar arpeggio utilizing a delay effect that is played at the beginning and end of the song. The song's frequent chord and time changes caused problems in playing the song correctly; the difficulty was so great that producer Brian Eno attempted to erase the track. Drummer Larry Mullen Jr. later said of the song, "It took so long to get that song right, it was difficult for us to make any sense of it. It only became a truly great song through playing live. On the record, musically, it's not half the song it is live."

Who's Gonna Ride Your Wild Horses
"Who's Gonna Ride Your Wild Horses" was released in 1992 as the fifth and final single for the 1991 album Achtung Baby.

Wire
"Wire" is the third track on U2's 1984 album, The Unforgettable Fire. Described by Bono as the "hypodermic needle of the album", it features a fast-paced rhythm section and The Edge's classic ringing guitar sound. It was one of the first songs by the band that detailed drug addiction, a theme present in later songs such as "Bad" and "Running to Stand Still".

With or Without You
"With or Without You" is the lead single from U2's 1987 album, The Joshua Tree. It has since become highly acclaimed as one of the band's most popular songs. Released as a single in March 1987, it became the group's first American #1 hit.

Zoo Station
"Zoo Station" is the first track on U2's 1991 album Achtung Baby''.

See also
 U2
 U2 discography

Notes

1.  On this release, the title of "Drowning Man" was changed to "Drowning Man (Drowning)".
2.  This cover of "Even Better Than the Real Thing" was released as the "Julian Beeston Mix".
3.  This cover was in Serbian language and entitled "Model donjeg veša" (transl. "Lingerie Model").
4.  The songs "I Still Haven't Found What I'm Looking For" and "Sunday Bloody Sunday" were combined on this track.
5.  Live version recorded in a 2005 BBC Radio 1 Live Lounge; track was not released until November 2009.
6.  This cover of "Discothèque" was released as the "Suspiria Mix".

References

Covers
U2